The Cal Poly Pomona Broncos or Cal Poly Broncos are the athletic sports teams for the California State Polytechnic University, Pomona (Cal Poly Pomona).

Cal Poly Pomona has 11 varsity sports teams and offers student participation in a wide range of sports including soccer, volleyball, track and field, basketball, and baseball. Cal Poly Pomona participates at the NCAA's Division II (DII) level in the California Collegiate Athletic Association (CCAA).

The Broncos have 65 CCAA championships and 14 NCAA National Championships. Current and former Cal Poly athletes have won 7 Olympic medals (3 gold, 1 silver, and 3 bronze). As of 2021, Cal Poly ranks 3th in the nation in NCAA Division II Next College Student Athlete (NCSA) Power Rankings that calculate rankings based on NCSA recruiting network, general academic rankings by U.S. News & World Report Best Colleges, Integrated Postsecondary Education Data System (IPEDS) graduation rates and IPEDS average cost after aid.

Teams

While in existence, the Broncos' softball team appeared in seven Women's College World Series, in 1978, 1979, 1980, 1984, 1985, 1988 and 1989.

Championships

Appearances

The Cal Poly Pomona Broncos competed in the NCAA Tournament across 11 active sports (5 men's and 6 women's) 165 times at the Division II level.

 Baseball (12): 1976 • 1979 • 1980 • 1983 • 1985 • 1988 • 1993 • 2011 • 2014 • 2015 • 2016 • 2017
 Men's basketball (13): 1962 • 1964 • 1976 • 2003 • 2004 • 2005 • 2007 • 2009 • 2010 • 2013 • 2015 • 2016 • 2018
 Women's basketball (25): 1982 • 1983 • 1984 • 1985 • 1986 • 1987 • 1988 • 1989 • 1990 • 1991 • 1992 • 1993 • 1997 • 1998 • 1999 • 2000 • 2001 • 2002 • 2004 • 2005 • 2010 • 2011 • 2012 • 2014 • 2015
 Men's cross country (20): 1967 • 1983 • 1984 • 1985 • 1986 • 1988 • 1990 • 1992 • 1994 • 1996 • 1997 • 2003 • 2004 • 2005 • 2006 • 2013 • 2014 • 2015 • 2016 • 2018
 Women's cross country (4): 1985 • 2010 • 2016 • 2017
 Men's soccer (5): 1998 • 2015 • 2016 • 2017 • 2018
 Women's soccer (4): 1999 • 2001 • 2012 • 2014
 Men's outdoor track and field (38): 1965 • 1967 • 1968 • 1971 • 1972 • 1973 • 1975 • 1976 • 1977 • 1978 • 1980 • 1981 • 1982 • 1984 • 1986 • 1987 • 1988 • 1989 • 1991 • 1992 • 1993 • 1994 • 1995 • 1996 • 1997 • 1999 • 2000 • 2002 • 2004 • 2005 • 2007 • 2009 • 2011 • 2012 • 2014 • 2015 • 2017 • 2018
 Women's outdoor track and field (27): 1982 • 1983 • 1984 • 1985 • 1986 • 1987 • 1988 • 1989 • 1990 • 1991 • 1992 • 1993 • 1994 • 1995 • 1996 • 1997 • 1998 • 1999 • 2002 • 2004 • 2006 • 2007 • 2008 • 2009 • 2013 • 2014 • 2016
 Women's volleyball (16): 1983 • 1984 • 1985 • 1988 • 1990 • 1991 • 1992 • 1993 • 1994 • 1996 • 1997 • 2004 • 2005 • 2007 • 2008 • 2018

Team
The Broncos of Cal Poly Pomona earned 12 NCAA championships at the Division II level.

Men's (5)
 Baseball (3): 1976, 1980, 1983
 Basketball (1): 2010
 Cross country (1): 1983
Women's (7)
 Basketball (5): 1982, 1985, 1986, 2001, 2002
 Tennis (2): 1991, 1992

Results

Below are two national championships that were not bestowed by the NCAA:

 Women's tennis – Division II (2): 1980, 1981 (AIAW)

Below is one national club team championship:

 Co-ed roller hockey (1): 2003 (NCRHA)

Individual

Cal Poly Pomona had 25 Broncos win NCAA individual championships at the Division II level.

At the NCAA Division I level, Cal Poly Pomona garnered 1 individual champion.

Conference championships

CCAA regular season championships (67)
Cal Poly Pomona has won CCAA regular season championships in the following events:

Men's sports (30):
Men's Water Polo  -  1974, 1975, 1976, 1977, 1978
Men's Baseball  -  1976, 1979, 1980, 1983, 1985, 1988, 1991, 2015
Men's Basketball  -  1980-81, 2004–05, 2008–09, 2009–10, 2012–13, 2017-18, 2018-19
Men's Cross Country  -  1983, 1985, 1994, 1996, 1997
Men's Outdoor Track & Field  -  1972, 1997, 1998
Men's Soccer  -  2014, 2018
Women's sports (37):
Women's Basketball  -  1981-82, 1982–83, 1983–84, 1984–85, 1985–86, 1986–87, 1987–88, 1988–89, 1989–90, 1990–91, 1991–92, 1992–93, 1993–94, 1996–97, 1997–98, 1999–00, 2000–01, 2001–02, 2013–14
Women's Soccer  -  1991, 1999
Women's Tennis  -  1983, 1985, 1987, 1990, 1991, 1992, 1993, 1994, 1997, 1998, 2003
Women's Outdoor Track & Field  - 1997, 1998
Women's Volleyball  -  1981, 1990, 2005

CCAA Tournament championships (18)
Cal Poly Pomona has won CCAA tournament championships in the following events:

Men's sports (7):
Men's Baseball  -  2015, 2019
Men's Basketball  -  2013, 2015
Men's Soccer  -  2014, 2015, 2019
Women's sports (11):
Women's Basketball  -  1986, 1987, 1988, 1989, 1990, 1991, 1992, 1993, 1997, 1998, 2011

Olympics

Olympic medalists

Former sports

Football
Cal Poly Pomona fielded a college football team in Division II through the 1982 season. Jim Zorn was the Broncos' quarterback in 1973 and 1974; he played in the NFL for a decade, most notably as the starter for the expansion Seattle Seahawks.

Club sports
There are currently 8 club sports at Cal Poly Pomona.
basketball
soccer
volleyball
tennis
cycling
roller hockey
martial arts
ultimate frisbee
All students may only participate in any clubs/activities with a 3.0 GPA or higher.

Bronco Pep Band

The Bronco Pep Band is a student-run band at the university. The band is currently a group within the Athletics Department.

Cal Poly Pomona music department student Daniel Sandt became the first director of what became known as "Bronco Pep Band version 2.0".

Directors

Daniel Sandt (2002–2005) 
Steven Corral (2005–2009) 
James Rodriguez (2009-2012)
Branden Herron (2012-2014)
Ramiro Castañeda (2014-2016)
Kingsley Hickman (2016-2018)
Viral Shukla (2018–2020)
Omar Arellano (2020–present)

Fight song

The first fight song
Song of the Viking
Words by Jerry Voorhis, Sung to the tune of The Maine Stein Song

The new fight song

Cal Poly Pomona Fight Song
Words sung to the trio section of John Philip Sousa's Solid Men to the Front.

Unofficial Fight Song
The  finale of the overture to the opera William Tell has served as the university's fight song.

See also
Cal Poly Pomona Broncos men's basketball

References

External links